Zanthoxylum oxyphyllum is a tree from the family Rutaceae.

Description
Zanthoxylum oxyphyllum is a small deciduous tree found Bhutan, NE India, Myanmar, Nepal.

Classification
The species was published in Transactions of the Linnean Society of London in 1846.

References

oxyphyllum